It Was Always So Nice With You is a 1954 West German musical comedy film directed by Hans Wolff and starring Heinz Drache, Georg Thomalla and Ingrid Stenn. The Swedish actress Zarah Leander who had been the leading German film star during the Nazi era, plays a self-referential role as a maturing film star. The film was intended as a tribute to the composer Theo Mackeben with many of his hit songs sung by Leander and Kirsten Heiberg, another star of the 1940s.

It was shot at the Wandsbek Studios in Hamburg. The film's sets were designed by the art director Rolf Zehetbauer.

Cast
 Heinz Drache as Peter Martens
 Georg Thomalla as Karl Holler
 Ingrid Stenn as Elisabeth
 Grethe Weiser as Aunt Martha
 Albrecht Schoenhals as Publisher Conrads
 Carsta Löck as Secretary
 Willy Maertens as Father Hannemann
 Helmuth Rudolph as 2nd Film Director
 Robert Kersten as Filmstar
 Willi Forst as Film Director
 Kirsten Heiberg as Cabarre Singer
 Margot Hielscher as Revue Star
 Zarah Leander as Filmstar
 Sonja Ziemann as Ballett Dancer
 Grete Sellier as Dancer
 Willy Dirtl as Dancer
 Erwin Bredow as Dancer
 Arthur Bankmann as Dancer
 Helmut Ketels as Dancer
 I.P. Schaich as Dancer
 Klaus Zimmermann as Dancer
 Eddi Arent as Peters Begleiter in Hafenbar

References

Bibliography 
 Anne Commire & Deborah Klezmer. Women in World History: A Biographical Encyclopedia, Volume 9. Yorkin Publications, 1999.

External links 
 

1954 films
1954 musical comedy films
German musical comedy films
West German films
1950s German-language films
Films directed by Hans Wolff
Films about filmmaking
Films about composers
Films set in the 1930s
Films shot at Wandsbek Studios
German black-and-white films
1950s German films